Gandarela de Basto is a town in Portugal. It is part of the Celorico de Basto Municipality.

Towns in Portugal